Kartarpur may refer to:

Kartarpur, India, a town in Jalandhar district, Punjab, India
Kartarpur, Rupnagar, a village in Rupnagar district, Punjab, India
Kartarpur, Pakistan, a village in Narowal District, Punjab, Pakistan
Kartarpur Assembly Constituency, Punjab, India

See also
Battle of Kartarpur, a 1635 siege of Kartarpur, India by the Mughal Empire
Kartarpur Corridor, an Indo-Pakistani border gate